John Rugoiyo Gichuki is a teacher and columnist in Kenya. He won the BBC's African Playwriting competition for 2006 with his play Eternal, Forever, and the BBC's African Performance playwriting competition in 2004 with his play A Time for Cleansing, a play about incest and refugees in Rwanda.

References

Living people
Year of birth missing (living people)
Kenyan writers
Kenyan male writers